Methanandamide (AM-356) is a synthetically created stable chiral analog of anandamide.  Its effects have been observed to act on the cannabinoid receptors (specifically on CB1 receptors, which are part of the central nervous system) found in different organisms such as mammals, fish, and certain invertebrates (e.g. Hydra).

References

Fatty acid amides

Primary alcohols
AM cannabinoids